Unarchigal is a 2005 Indian Tamil-language drama film directed by K. Rajan. The film stars Sriman, Abitha and Abhinayashree, while K. Rajan, Kunal and Radha Ravi also appear in supporting roles. The film was released to a mixed response in December 2005.

Cast
Sriman as Ramesh
Abitha as 	Amrutha
Abhinayashree as Kavitha
K. Rajan as Ramesh and Kavitha's father
Kunal as Lakshmi's husband
Radha Ravi as Seshadri
Manorama
 Lakshmi as herself 
Manobala as Manager
Mayilsamy as Kalyanaraman
 Balaji as himself
Singamuthu as Broker
Abbas as Balaji (Guest appearance)
Chitra Lakshmanan as Balaji's father (Guest appearance)

Production
In June 2005, director K. Rajan chose to shelve his biopic of Sivakasi Jayalakshmi titled Niram Maraiya Rojakal starring Vindhya after another film, Alaiyadikkuthu (2005) starring Sindhu Tolani, had already covered the issue. Rajan then began working on a project titled Unarchigal which would explore the life of adolescent youths and cast actresses Devayani and Sindhuri in the lead roles, alongside newcomer male actors. However a production delay meant that the film went through a change of cast and Rajan started the project with Abbas and Kunal. Titled Unarchigal, the film began production in July 2005 with Abitha and Abhinayashree also signed. The film's soundtrack was released on 10 September 2005 in an event presided over by chief guest, actor Parthiepan.

Soundtrack
Soundtrack was composed by R. K. Sundar.
"Mannuranga" — Manorama
"Vithithana" — Karthik
"Poomaalaiyo" — Saindhavi
"Roopthera" — Malathi

Release
Upon release, the film received negative reviews from critics.

References

2005 films
2000s Tamil-language films
Indian drama films
2005 drama films